The 2017 Dunlop MSA British Touring Car Championship (commonly abbreviated as BTCC) was a motor racing championship for production-based touring cars held across England and Scotland. The championship featured a mix of professional motor racing teams and privately funded amateur drivers competing in highly modified versions of family cars which are sold to the general public and conform to the technical regulations for the championship. The 2017 season was the 60th British Touring Car Championship season and the seventh season for cars conforming to the Next Generation Touring Car (NGTC) technical specification.

With both BMW and Vauxhall returning to the series this year as manufacturer outfits - joining the existing Honda, Subaru and MG teams, the 2017 season featured five manufacturer backed teams on the grid for the first time since the end of the popular Super Touring era of the sport.

With a maximum grid of 32 cars for the 2017 season, a full entry list was announced which sees a total of 18 different named teams.

Teams and drivers

Driver Changes 
Changed teams
 Andrew Jordan will move from Motorbase Performance to West Surrey Racing.
 Matt Simpson will move from Speedworks Motorsport to Team Dynamics.
 Chris Smiley will move from TLC Racing to BTC Norlin Racing.
 Dave Newsham will move from Power Maxed Racing to BTC Norlin Racing.
 Martin Depper will move from Eurotech Racing to Motorbase Performance.
 Jack Goff will move from Team IHG Rewards Club to Eurotech Racing.
 Árón Taylor-Smith will move from Team BKR to MG Racing RCIB Insurance.
 Ashley Sutton will move from MG Racing RCIB Insurance to Team BMR.
 Colin Turkington will move from Team BMR to West Surrey Racing.
 Josh Cook will move from MG Racing RCIB Insurance to Maximum Motorsport.

Entering/re-entering BTCC
 2016 Ginetta GT4 Supercup runner-up Will Burns will make his debut in the BTCC with Team HARD.
 Senna Proctor son of former BTCC racer Mark Proctor, will make his debut in the series with Power Maxed Racing.
 Tom Chilton will return to the series with Power Maxed Racing, after a five-year absence, having last raced in the championship in 2011.
 2016 Renault UK Clio Cup champion Ant Whorton-Eales will make his debut in the BTCC with AmD Tuning.
 Luke Davenport will make his debut in the BTCC with Motorbase Performance.
 Stephen Jelley will return to the series Team Parker Racing, after a seven-year absence, having last raced in the championship in 2009.
 Daniel Lloyd will return to the series with MG Racing RCIB Insurance, after taking part in three rounds in 2016 with Eurotech Racing.
 Former Renault UK Clio Cup racer Josh Price will make his debut in the championship with Team BMR.

Leaving BTCC
 Sam Tordoff will leave West Surrey Racing and the series to concentrate on other ventures.
 Alex Martin will leave the series and return to the Porsche Carrera Cup GB with Team Parker Racing.
 Stewart Lines vacated his seat at Maximum Motorsport following a cycling accident.
  Warren Scott will step down from driving duties to concentrate on his role as Team Principal of Team BMR.  He will also take part in the 2017 British Rallycross Championship.

Team Changes 
 Team HARD will switch from Toyota Avensis to Volkswagen CC.
 Power Maxed Racing will switch from Chevrolet Cruze to Vauxhall Astra. The team will also enter the constructor class with manufacturer support from Vauxhall Motors.
 Motorbase Performance will expand to three cars having loaned TBL from Welch Motorsport.
 BTC Racing will return to the series with two Chevrolet Cruze having bought the two TBL from Power Maxed Racing.
 West Surrey Racing will receive full manufacturer support from BMW, competing under the Team BMW banner.

Mid Season Changes 
 Daniel Lloyd left MG Racing RCIB Insurance after Oulton Park and was replaced by former MG driver Josh Cook from Croft onwards. Scandinavian Touring Car driver Dennis Strandberg took Cook's place at Maximum Motorsport at Croft. Stewart Lines then took the race seat from Snetterton onwards.
 Brett Smith replaced his father Jeff Smith at Eurotech Racing after the Croft qualifying crash ruled Jeff out for the remainder of the season.
 Rory Butcher replaced the injured Luke Davenport from the Knockhill round for the remainder of the season.

Race calendar

The provisional calendar was announced by the championship organisers on 15 June 2016, with no major changes from previous seasons.

Results

Championship standings

Notes
No driver may collect more than one point for leading a lap per race regardless of how many laps they lead.

Drivers' Championship
(key)

Manufacturers'/Constructors' Championship

Teams' Championship

Independents Drivers' Trophy

Independent Teams' Trophy

Jack Sears Trophy

Footnotes

References

External links

TouringCarTimes

British Touring Car Championship seasons
Touring Car Championship